Parmesan is an Italian hard, granular cheese produced from cows' milk and aged at least 12 months.

It is named after two of the areas which produce it, the provinces of Parma and Reggio Emilia (Parmigiano is the Italian adjective for Parma and Reggiano that for Reggio Emilia). In addition to Reggio Emilia and Parma, it is also produced in the part of Bologna west of the River Reno and in Modena (all of the above being located in the Emilia-Romagna region), as well as in the part of Mantua (Lombardy) which is on the south bank of the River Po. 

Both "Parmigiano Reggiano" and "Parmesan" are protected designations of origin (PDO) for cheeses produced in these provinces under Italian and European law. Outside the EU, the name "Parmesan" can legally be used for similar cheeses, with only the full Italian name unambiguously referring to PDO Parmigiano Reggiano.

It has been called the "King of Cheeses" and "practically perfect food", whilst in 2023, the guide TasteAtlas has picked Parmigiano Reggiano as best cheese in the world.

Parmigiano Reggiano Production 

Parmigiano Reggiano is made from unpasteurised cows' milk. The whole milk of the morning milking is mixed with the naturally skimmed milk (which is made by keeping milk in large shallow tanks to allow the cream to separate) of the previous evening's milking, resulting in a part skim mixture. This mixture is pumped into copper-lined vats, which heat evenly and contribute copper ions to the mix.

Calf rennet is added, and the mixture is left to curdle for 10–12 minutes. The curd is then broken up mechanically into small pieces (around the size of rice grains). The curd is left to settle for 45–60 minutes. The compacted curd is collected in a piece of muslin before being divided in two and placed in molds. The remaining whey in the vat was traditionally used to feed the pigs from which Prosciutto di Parma (cured Parma ham) was produced. The barns for these animals were usually just a few metres away from the cheese production rooms.

The cheese is put into a stainless steel, round form that is pulled tight with a spring-powered buckle so the cheese retains its wheel shape. After a day or two, the buckle is released and a plastic belt imprinted numerous times with the Parmigiano Reggiano name, the plant's number, and month and year of production is put around the cheese and the metal form is buckled tight again. The imprints take hold on the rind of the cheese in about a day and the wheel is then put into a brine bath to absorb salt for 20–25 days. After brining, the wheels are then transferred to the aging rooms in the plant for 12 months. Each cheese is placed on wooden shelves that can be 24 cheeses high by 90 cheeses long or 2160 total wheels per aisle. Each cheese and the shelf underneath it is then cleaned manually or robotically every seven days, and the cheese is turned.

At 12 months, the Consorzio Parmigiano Reggiano inspects every wheel. The cheese is tested by a master grader who taps each wheel to identify undesirable cracks and voids within the wheel. Wheels that pass the test are then heat-branded on the rind with the Consorzio's logo. Those that do not pass the test used to have their rinds marked with lines or crosses all the way around to inform consumers that they are not getting top-quality Parmigiano Reggiano; more recent practices simply have these lesser rinds stripped of all markings.

Traditionally cows are fed only on grass or hay, producing grass-fed milk. Only natural whey culture is allowed as a starter, together with calf rennet.

The only additive allowed is salt, which the cheese absorbs while being submerged for 20 days in brine tanks saturated to near-total salinity with Mediterranean sea salt. The product is aged an average of two years. The cheese is produced daily, and it can show a natural variability. True Parmigiano Reggiano cheese has a sharp, complex fruity/nutty taste with a strong savory flavour and a slightly gritty texture. Inferior versions can impart a bitter taste.

Industry

Besides setting and enforcing the standards for the PDO, the Consorzio also sponsors marketing activities.

, about 3.6 million wheels (approx. 137,000 metric tons) of Parmesan are produced every year; they use about 18% of all the milk produced in Italy.

Most workers in the Italian dairy industry (bergamini) belong to the Italian General Confederation of Labour. As older dairy workers retire, younger Italians have tended to work in factories or offices. Immigrants have filled that role, with 60% of the workers in the Parmesan industry now immigrants from India, almost all Sikhs.

Uses 
Parmigiano Reggiano is commonly grated over pasta dishes, stirred into soups and risottos, and eaten on its own. It is often shaved or grated over other dishes like salads.

Slivers and chunks of the hardest parts of the crust (also called the rind) are sometimes simmered in soups, broths, and sauces to add flavour. They can also be broiled and eaten as a snack if they have no wax on them. They can also be infused in olive oil or used in a steamer basket while steaming vegetables.

History 

According to legend, Parmigiano Reggiano was created in the course of the Middle Ages in Bibbiano, in the province of Reggio Emilia. Its production soon spread to the Parma and Modena areas. Historical documents show that in the 13th and 14th centuries, Parmigiano was already very similar to that produced today, which suggests its origins can be traced to far earlier. Some evidence suggests that the name was used for Parmesan cheese in Italy and France in the 17th-19th century.

It was praised as early as 1348 in the writings of Boccaccio; in the Decameron, he invents a 'mountain, all of grated Parmesan cheese', on which 'dwell folk that do nought else but make macaroni and ravioli, and boil them in capon's broth, and then throw them down to be scrambled for; and hard by flows a rivulet of Vernaccia, the best that ever was drunk, and never a drop of water therein.'

During the Great Fire of London of 1666, Samuel Pepys buried his "Parmazan cheese, as well as his wine and some other things" to preserve them.

In the memoirs of Giacomo Casanova, he remarked that the name "Parmesan" was a misnomer common throughout an "ungrateful" Europe in his time (mid-18th century), as the cheese was produced in the town of Lodi, Lombardy, not Parma. Though Casanova knew his table and claimed in his memoir to have been compiling a (never completed) dictionary of cheeses, his comment has been taken to refer mistakenly to a grana cheese similar to "Parmigiano", Grana Padano, which is produced in the Lodi area.

Parmigiano Reggiano has been the target of organized crime in Italy, particularly the Mafia or Camorra, which ambush delivery trucks on the Autostrada A1 in northern Italy between Milan and Bologna, hijacking shipments. The cheese is ultimately sold in southern Italy. Between November 2013 and January 2015, an organised crime gang stole 2039 wheels of Parmigiano Reggiano from warehouses in northern and central Italy.

October 27 is designated "Parmigiano Reggiano Day" by The Consortium of Parmigiano Reggiano.

This day celebrating the "King of Cheese" originated in response to the two earthquakes hitting the area of origin in May 2012. The devastation was profound, displacing tens of thousands of residents, collapsing factories, and massively damaging historical churches, bell towers, and other landmarks.

Years of cheese production were lost during the disaster, about $50 million worth, reported by the New York Times, potentially threatening the livelihood of cheesemakers whose families produced this product for generations. It was Modena native and renowned Chef Massimo Bottura, who The Consortium turned to for an outsized solution to help save the cheese. Bottura's three-Michelin starred Osteria Francescana, named the World's Top Restaurant in 2018 and 2016 by the prestigious San Pellegrino ranking (now in its Hall of Fame) is located in his hometown near the quake's epicenter. Massimo Bottura's response to the situation was a single recipe: Riso cacio e pepe. He invited the world through social media and online outlets to cook this new dish along with him launching "Parmigiano Reggiano Day" - October 27.

Aroma and chemical components 

Parmigiano has many aroma-active compounds, including various aldehydes and butyrates. Butyric acid and isovaleric acid together are sometimes used to imitate the dominant aromas.

Parmigiano is also particularly high in glutamate, containing as much as 1.2 g of glutamate per 100 g of cheese. The high concentration of glutamate explains the strong umami taste of Parmigiano.

Parmigiano cheese typically contains cheese crystals, semi-solid to gritty crystalline spots that at least partially consist of the amino acid tyrosine.

Uses of the name 

The name is legally protected in the European Union and, in Italy, exclusive control is exercised over the cheese's production and sale by the Parmigiano Reggiano cheese Consorzio, which was created by a governmental decree. Each wheel must meet strict criteria early in the aging process, when the cheese is still soft and creamy, to merit the official seal and be placed in storage for aging. Because it is widely imitated, Parmigiano Reggiano has become an increasingly regulated product, and in 1955 it became what is known as a certified name (which is not the same as a brand name). In 2008, an EU court determined that the name "Parmesan" in Europe only refers to Parmigiano Reggiano and cannot be used for imitation Parmesan. Thus, in the European Union, "Parmigiano Reggiano" is a protected designation of origin (PDO – DOP in Italian); legally, the name refers exclusively to the Parmigiano Reggiano PDO cheese manufactured in a limited area in northern Italy. Special seals identify the product as authentic, with the identification number of the dairy, the production month and year, a code identifying the individual wheel and stamps regarding the length of aging.

Non-European Parmesan cheese 
Parmesan cheese made outside of the European Union is a family of hard grating cheeses made from cows' milk and inspired by the original Italian cheese. They are generally pale yellow in color and usually used grated on dishes such as pasta, Caesar salad and pizza. Some American generic Parmesan is sold already grated and has been aged for less than 12 months. 

Within the European Union, the term Parmesan may be used, by law, to refer only to Parmigiano Reggiano itself, which must be made in a restricted geographic area, using stringently defined methods. In many areas outside Europe the name "Parmesan" has become genericised and may denote any of a number of hard Italian-style grating cheeses, often commercialised under names intended to evoke the original, such as Parmesan, Parmigiana, Parmesana, Parmabon, Real Parma, Parmezan, or Parmezano. After the European ruling that "parmesan" could not be used as a generic name, Kraft renamed its grated cheese "Pamesello" in Europe.

Non-European production 

Parmesan cheese is defined differently in various jurisdictions outside of Europe. In the United States the Code of Federal Regulations includes a Standard of Identity for "Parmesan and reggiano cheese". This defines both aspects of the production process and of the final result. In particular, Parmesan must be made of cow's milk, cured for 10 months or more, contain no more than 32% water, and have no less than 32% milkfat in its solids. 

Kraft Foods is a major North American producer of Parmesan and has been selling it since 1945. 

A number of non-European parmesan producers have taken strong objection to the attempts of the European Union to globally control the trademark of the Parmesan name, claiming that it is more about control of trade than control of quality.

Adulteration controversy 
Several American manufacturers have been investigated for allegedly going beyond the 4% cellulose limit. In one case, FDA findings found "no parmesan cheese was used to manufacture" a Pennsylvania manufacturer's grated cheese labeled "Parmesan", apparently made from a mixture of other cheeses and cellulose. The manufacturer declared bankruptcy in 2014 and their president was expected to plead guilty to criminal charges, facing up to $100,000 in fines and a year in jail.

Similar cheeses

Grana Padano 

Grana Padano is an Italian cheese similar to Parmigiano Reggiano, but is produced mainly in Lombardy, where "Padano" refers to the Po Valley (Pianura Padana); the cows producing the milk may be fed silage as well as grass; the milk may contain slightly less fat, milk from several different days may be used, and must be aged a minimum of 9 months.

Gran Moravia 
Gran Moravia is a cheese from the Czech Republic similar to Grana Padano and Parmigiano.

Reggianito 

Reggianito is an Argentine cheese similar to Parmigiano. Developed by Italian Argentine cheesemakers, the cheese is made in smaller wheels and aged for less time, but is otherwise broadly similar.

See also 

 List of cheeses
 Parmesan knife

References

External links 
 Official website
 

Italian cheeses
Italian products with protected designation of origin
Cow's-milk cheeses
Umami enhancers
Cheeses with designation of origin protected in the European Union
Cuisine of Emilia-Romagna
Articles containing video clips
Italian cuisine
Mediterranean cuisine
Western cuisine